Mikhnovo is a rural locality (a khutor) in Tkhorevskoye Rural Settlement, Kamensky District, Voronezh Oblast, Russia. The population was 73 as of 2010. There are 2 streets.

Geography 
Mikhnovo is located 11 km northwest of Kamenka (the district's administrative centre) by road. Tkhorevka is the nearest rural locality.

References 

Rural localities in Kamensky District, Voronezh Oblast